The Karamazov Brothers is a 2008 Czech film directed by Petr Zelenka with a soundtrack by Jan A. P. Kaczmarek. It tells the story of a group of Czech actors who come to Polish steelworks to perform a stage adaptation of Fyodor Dostoevsky's 1880 novel The Brothers Karamazov at an alternative drama festival. As rehearsals get under way, we follow not only the emotional story examining issues of faith, immortality and the salvation of the human soul, but also the relationships within the acting troupe itself, which strangely reflect Dostoevsky's "great" themes. The stage drama is transferred to the real world when a tragedy occurs during rehearsal involving one of the spectators. Karamazovi won the International Federation of Film Critics (FIPRESCI) award in Karlovy Vary International Film Festival in 2008 and was submitted by The Czech Republic for the 2009 Academy Award for Best Foreign Film.

Plot summary

Cast
 Michaela Badinková as Katya
 Jerzy Michal Bozyk as Pianist
 Igor Chmela as Ivan Karamazov
 Malgorzata Galkowska		
 Radek Holub as Smerdyakov
 Lenka Krobotová as Grushenka

See also 
 Bratya Karamazovy, a 1969 Soviet adaptation of the same novel

References

External links 
 
 

2008 films
Czech drama films
Films based on The Brothers Karamazov
Films directed by Petr Zelenka
Films scored by Jan A. P. Kaczmarek
Czech Lion Awards winners (films)
2000s Czech films